The siege of Genoa on 13–18 April 1814 was the capture of the port city of Genoa by a British–Sicilian army from the First French Empire. It was the last battle of the War of the Sixth Coalition's Italian campaign, as on 4 April, Napoleon had abdicated as emperor of France.

The Anglo-Sicilian forces, commanded by Lieutenant General William Bentinck, laid siege to the Ligurian capital, while the Austrians occupied Lombardy (destroying the Kingdom of Italy), and proclaimed the ephemeral Republic of Genoa, then abolished at the behest of the Congress of Vienna and ceded to the restored Kingdom of Sardinia.

Historical context 

Setting sail from Sicily on January 30, 1814 , William Bentinck initially made his way to Naples . There he reluctantly signed an armistice with Joachim Murat , whom he personally detested as a man whose "whole life had been a crime", yet whom Britain found it expedient to detach from his brother-in-law, Napoleon, by guaranteeing his Kingdom of Naples in return for an alliance. Having instructed the forces under his command in Sicily to make a landing at Livorno, Bentinck then travelled north, with a day's stop in Rome, to join them. The disembarkation at Livorno began on the 9 March and took three days to complete, Murat's Neapolitans already having occupied the port beforehand.

Napoleon's sister Elisa, though having now abandoned her Grand Duchy of Tuscany, had nevertheless not given up completely in attempting to salvage something out of the collapse of her brother's Empire. Having obtained from Murat - husband of her sister Caroline - the guarantee that he would obtain the consent of the Coalition he had just joined to her retention of the Principality of Lucca and Piombino in return for having rendered up Tuscany without a fight, she had, by the time of Bentinck's appearance at Livorno, retired to Lucca. Upon hearing of his landing, she sent a delegation to gain assurances that Murat's pact would be respected. Bentinck replied that it would not. If she did not depart immediately, he said, she would arrested. With 2,000 British troops dispatched towards the city to carry out this threat, the heavily pregnant Elisa had no choice but to abandon the last of her territories and flee north, where she eventually fell into allied hands at Bologna.

Elisa left Lucca on March 13. The next day, Bentinck issued a proclamation from Livorno calling on the Italian nation to rise up in a liberation movement. He declared:

"Italians!
Great Britain has landed her troops on your shores; she holds out her hand to you to free you from the iron yoke of Buonaparte...hesitate no longer...assert your rights and your liberty. Call us, and we will hasten to you, and then, our forces joined, will effect that Italy may become what in the best times she was.

In thus attempting to bring about his long-nurtured dream of an independent Italian nation-state in the north and centre (he did not consider Neapolitans and Sicilians to be "Italian"), Bentinck was quite publicly repudiating the policy of his own Government - which was intending to largely restore the status quo ante bellum in Italy; with Austria in possession of Lombardy and the King of Sardinia re-established in Piedmont. For the next month, Bentinck was therefore operating as effectively an independent actor representative of Britain only, as Rosselli says, in the widest sense: in that he held himself to be furthering Britain's true interests, regardless of whether the current Government recognised them or not.

Ordering his troops north to besiege Genoa, Bentinck himself now headed to Reggio Emilia for a conference with Murat. At this conference on the 15th, he brazenly demanded that Tuscany be handed over to himself and evacuated by the Neapolitan forces then in possession of it. It was necessary, he argued, that Tuscany be under British jurisdiction, as otherwise he would have no logistical base from which to conduct future operations - to which Murat replied that it was the same argument on his side which dictated his own necessary possession of it. Suddenly threatening to turn his forces against Naples itself and restore the rightful Ferdinand IV if Murat did not give way, Bentinck was quickly reprimanded in a firm note from Castlereagh reminding him that he was instructed to co-operate in every way with Murat and Austria. At which he reluctantly withdrew his bid for Tuscany - which he had likely been hoping to turn into the nucleus of a free Italian state under his own aegis - and left for Genoa. There had, in any case, been no discernible response from the Tuscans to Bentinck's proclamation, while in Genoa he would find a welcoming audience at last.

Bentinck had been ordered to take and occupy Genoa in the name of the king of Sardinia, Vittorio Emanuele I of Savoy.

Course of the battle

The Coalition approaches Genoa 
On 9 April, General Jean Pégot, sent to Genoa by the Viceroy of Italy Eugène de Beauharnais, was commissioned by General Maurizio Ignazio Fresia, commander of the garrison of the Ligurian capital since February, to replace General Jean Victor Rouyer. On the same day, Recco was again heavily bombarded by the Coalition; the next day the fire was renewed and the French ships were forced to evacuate.

On the evening of the 9th, General Pégot, having learned that an Austrian detachment of the corps of Laval Nugent von Westmeath had joined the insurgents at Val Fontanabuona, and seeing that the British continued to fire on Recco and Sori, Liguria, decided to leave his position, overnight. The retreat took place in good order, and on the morning of the 10th Pégot occupied the position of Monte Fasce.

The Coalition had nine ships of the line and three or four frigates in front of Genoa, as well as a large number of transports. The French saw them move towards Savona, which made them fear for a moment the landing on the beach, which stretched from Sampierdarena to Arenzano ; this beach was manned only by three detachments of the 102nd Infantry Regiment (France), stationed in Arenzano, Voltri and Sestri Ponente.

On the 12th the Coalition attacked Pégot in the position of Monte Fasce. They fought all day, but the general, finding it impossible to resist, withdrew during the night; he went to occupy the position of Sturla, on the heights of Albaro, with the right to the sea, covered by a battery of 4 artillery pieces, and the left to Fort Richelieu.

Siege 
Coalition forces arrived near the walls of Genoa on 13 April. Bentinck was the commander of the British troops and commander in chief while the Sicilians were under General Vito Nunziante. The confrontation focused mainly on Sturla and Albaro, where the British were preparing a general attack.

That day the allies landed at Nervi with infantry, artillery and cavalry, and attacked the position of Sturla. At the beginning of the action, the gunners of the Sturla battery bombarded them but then abandoned the position. Pégot brought them back and ordered to open fire again. The general was wounded in the clash. General Jean-Pierre Piat, who was nearby, replaced him. The fighting lasted all day on the heights of Albaro, and in the evening the Coalition howitzers succeeded in destroying the battery of Sturla. [Meaning lost in translation from Italian to English]

On the 14th the British renewed their attack on Albaro's position. Bentinck was there in person. The British general had announced to the Genoese, through an emissary, that he would be inside the city the next day; he counted on the superiority of his strength. This information sparked some demonstrations in the city, and General Fresia considered it his duty to invite the municipality to deploy the Garde Nationale, although there was already some disorder in this body. But there was no other way to keep the peace.

On the 17th, at two in the morning, the British carried out a false attack between Sestri Ponente and Sampierdarena, with fire support from the artillery. At five in the morning they opened fire on the French battery positioned to the left of Sturla. The Coalition approached the French ships from the coast and attacked with all their forces, amounting to more than 15,000 men, the positions of San Martino and San Francesco. The French troops were forced to evacuate their positions, as well as the plateau between the Richelieu, Santa Tecla and Sperone forts.

The batteries of the Torre dell'Amore, taken from behind, were removed, and the Coalition bombarded the city. This induced the Genoese to rebel against the French. The mayor and archbishop Giuseppe Spina went to Fresia to urge him to capitulate. The general allowed the municipality to send a delegation to Bentinck to urge him to suspend the bombardment. Bentinck refused any proposal and demanded that the city be handed over, after the capitulation of the forts Santa Tecla and Richelieu. The French troops then withdrew, in good order, behind the Bisagno (river), and the British did not pass San Martino d'Albaro.

The civil unrest in the city increased during the day and night of the 17th, without the Garde Nationale bothering to calm it down. The next day the besieged surrendered.

Also on the 18th, around noon, Bentinck sent Lieutenant General Robert Henry MacFarlane to hasten the surrender, threatening, if refused, to restart the attacks and bombings. The day was spent in negotiations and the next night the evacuation convention was signed. Thus, on April 20, the British entered the city. Fresia was able to leave Genoa with military honours.

Consequences 
When the city surrendered to him on 18 April 1814, he instead proclaimed - contrary to the intentions of the Coalition - the restoration of the Republic of Genoa and the repeal of all laws passed since 1797 , much to the enthusiasm of the Genoese population. At the same time, he dispatched an expeditionary force to Corsica to attempt to revive the Anglo-Corsican Kingdom of 1794–1796 and gain for Britain another useful base in the Mediterranean. In Genoa meanwhile, on the 24th, he received representations from the provisional government in Milan beseeching Britain's support for the maintenance of an independent Kingdom of Italy rather than the restoration of Austria's rule over Lombardy. With Napoleon's abdication of both the French and Italian thrones on 11 April, the government in Milan was in search of a new sovereign who would better bolster their chances of survival and, in seeking to bind Britain to their cause, the suggestion was put to Bentinck that Prince Adolphus, Duke of Cambridge, the seventh son of George III, would be a welcome candidate. Though Bentinck recommended they might look to Archduke Francis of Este as a more realistic candidate in order to mollify the Austrians. In this regard, the Piedmontese general Vittorio Amedeo Sallier della Torre, commander of the Italian Levy of the British army, created a draft of the Constitution in which, looking forward to the union of Piedmont, Liguria and Lombardy, he hoped for a charter that would guarantee a liberal government, although he was a staunch reactionary.

With Napoleon's double abdication on the 11 April however - though the news took time to cross the Alps - Bentinck's capacity to influence events on the ground while, with the war against the Emperor still raging, all was still to a great extent up in the air, largely came to an end. As did his Government's motive for toleration. His erratic behaviour over the recent months had led the Prime Minister Lord Liverpool to brand him simply "mad", and his scope of authority was sharply reduced; though he was not finally dismissed from his grand post as Commander-in-Chief in the Mediterranean until April the following year.

References

Bibliography

Related items 
 Fall of the Kingdom of Italy
 1st Regiment Greek Light Infantry
 Siege of Genoa (1800)
 :it:Cattura di La Spezia
 :it:John Rosselli
 :it:Italian Levy
 :it:Calabrian Free Corps

Battles of the War of the Sixth Coalition
Sieges of the Napoleonic Wars
Sieges involving the United Kingdom
Sieges involving France
Conflicts in 1814
April 1814 events
1814 in Italy
Battles in Liguria
History of Genoa